The Scottish League Championship (Formerly Scottish Premiership Division Three) is the third tier of Scotland's national rugby union league system, and therefore part of the Scottish League Championship.

Between 1973 and 2012 the league was the lowest division in the Scottish Premiership and as such was a nationwide league with the best teams being promoted to Scottish Premiership Division Two and the bottom teams relegated to Scottish National League Division One.

Beginning in the 2012–13 season the SRU have regionalised the third tier of the Scottish League Championship, replacing the 12 team nationwide league with two 10 team 'East' and 'West' Championships.

Division Three, 2011-2012
Ardrossan Academicals RFC
Cartha Queens Park RFC
Dalziel RFC
Dumfries RFC
Greenock Wanderers RFC
Glasgow Hutchesons Aloysians RFC
Haddington RFC
Howe of Fife RFC
Kirkcaldy RFC
Lasswade RFC
Morgan Academy RFC
Perthshire RFC
Details:

Past winners

Kilmarnock RFC
Highland RFC
Haddington
Preston Lodge
Leith Academicals

Glasgow Academicals
Haddington
Ayr
Aberdeen GSFP

Musselburgh
Corstorphine
Currie
Langholm RFC
Kirkcaldy
Dundee HSFP
Peebles
Grangemouth Stags
Haddington
Gordonians RFC
Ayr

Kirkcaldy
Selkirk
Peebles
Edinburgh Academicals
Murrayfield Wanderers

Dundee HSFP
Edinburgh Academicals
Cartha Queens Park
Hamilton
Haddington
Hamilton
Kirkcaldy
Hillhead/Jordanhill
Whitecraigs
Howe of Fife RFC

References

4